Red Heaven is a studio album by the American band Throwing Muses, released in 1992. It peaked at number 13 on the UK Albums Chart. Throwing Muses promoted the album by touring with the Flaming Lips. "Firepile" was released as a single.

Production
The album was produced by Throwing Muses and Steve Boyer. It was the band's first album after the departure of Tanya Donnelly. Bob Mould sings a duet with Kristin Hersh on "Dio". Hersh played a Kramer guitar on many of the songs.

Critical reception

The Calgary Herald opined that "Kristin Hersh's angry and powerful lyrics are silenced by sterile and emotionless music." The Orlando Sentinel noted that "the slow, creepy 'Carnival Wig' is an eerie cross between John Lurie's soundtrack work and Nick Cave-style blues." The Indianapolis Star wrote: "Despair, loneliness and anger seep through these songs, but catching a precise meaning in Hersh's opaque lyrics is like trying to snatch up a tadpole in a muddy creek."

NME named it the 38th best album of 1992.

Track listing

Personnel
Credits adapted from liner notes.

Throwing Muses
 Kristin Hersh – guitars, vocals
 David Narcizo – drums, backing vocals

Additional musicians
 Leslie Langston – bass guitar
 Bob Mould – vocals on "Dio"

Technical personnel
 Throwing Muses – production
 Steve Boyer – production, engineering
 Paul Q. Kolderie – production assistance
 Artie Smith – production assistance
 Victor Deyglio – engineering assistance
 Howie Weinberg – mastering
 Christine Cano – package design, front cover artwork
 Kristin Hersh – front cover artwork
 David Narcizo – handwritten lyrics
 Michael Lavine – band photography

Charts

References

External links
 
 

Throwing Muses albums
1992 albums
4AD albums
Sire Records albums
Warner Records albums